Oobah Butler is an English author and filmmaker.  He is best known for creating The Shed at Dulwich, a fictional restaurant which became the top-rated venue in London on TripAdvisor in 2017, despite having never served a dish. In April 2019, Butler's debut book How to Bullsh*t Your Way To Number 1 was published and became an LA Times bestseller. In 2021, he became co-host of Catfish UK.

Career

Butler began writing for Vice Magazine in October 2015 after successfully pitching an article in which he challenged himself to be a more successful door-to-door salesman than one of the Jehovah's Witnesses. Over the next two years, he regularly contributed articles to Vice (including a story in which he created a "DIY sex robot" from household items and fruit) and eventually started making short films that were shared on the site's social media channels.

The Shed at Dulwich 
In April 2017, inspired by a belief he'd developed while being paid to write false positive reviews for restaurants on TripAdvisor years before, Butler came up with an idea to try and get a restaurant that doesn't exist verified on the travel website. After making a website for his fake restaurant, The Shed at Dulwich, which featured plates of food created using household products including shaving foam and dishwasher tablets, and buying a phone, it was officially accepted and listed on the site. From there, Butler spent six months asking friends to post fake reviews hoping to place the restaurant as high on TripAdvisor's list of 18,149 restaurants in London as possible.

On November 1, 2017, the Shed was the highest rated restaurant in London. It was open for one night on the 17th of the same month, serving ten guests thinly-disguised microwaveable meals based on various “moods”, at no charge.

Following the release of both his article and documentary, How to Become TripAdvisor’s #1 Fake Restaurant, about the process, the story became a viral success. To date, Vice claims it has received 100 million views worldwide.

Butler found himself at the centre of a media storm, appearing on popular television stations around the world. The reactions to the story were diverse, with Singaporean parliament using it as a vehicle to inform new laws on fake news and The Washington Post referencing Butler as "the Donald Trump of TripAdvisor". After conducting many interviews, Butler became convinced that it didn't need to be him being interviewed, saying, "Whether it's the segment on Brazil's Globo TV, or the hour-long documentary on Japanese TV, every interviewer has asked me the same questions about the shed. It's not really me being interviewed; what I did has some recognition, but I don’t.”

From there he successfully sent different lookalikes of himself in his place to conduct interviews on Breakfast Sunrise in Australia, WION in India, NOVA television in Bulgaria and BBC Radio 2 with Vanessa Feltz (who was standing in for Jeremy Vine on his lunchtime show).

Films and TV 
Butler documented the Shed at Dulwich in a video on Vice Magazine's YouTube channel, How to Become TripAdvisor’s #1 Fake Restaurant. He also made a short video about the subsequent lookalike interviews, titled I Sent Fakes of Myself to Be on TV Around the World.

In June 2018, Butler released a seven-minute film entitled How I Faked My Way to The Top of Paris Fashion Week, in which he masqueraded as fictional fashion designer “Georgio Peviani.” It was well received, being viewed over 30 million times worldwide and being included in the official selection at the 2018 LA Fashion Film Festival.

In 2021, Butler is due to co-host the UK edition of MTV's Catfish: The TV Show alongside Julie Adenuga. In May 2022, a second series of Catfish UK was announced with YouTube personality Nella Rose joining Butler as a new co-host in place of Julie Adenuga.

Book
In December 2018, he announced his debut book How to Bullsh*t Your Way To Number 1 in an interview with Forbes. On the date of the book's release, Oobah said in an interview with Robin Young on NPR that the book was less about success and more about helping people to not be inhibited. The book reached first place in a US book chart, #1 Humor in USA TODAY for the week of April 29, 2019 and was #8 on the Los Angeles Times paperback non-fiction chart in July 2019.

Awards
Butler received three awards in 2018 - one from the British Society of Magazine Editors for Best Content Idea 2018, Video Project of the Year from the British Media Awards, and another from the DRUM Agency for Content Creator of the Year 2018, which he sent a Norwegian stand-in to accept, and nobody realised. Butler also received a 2019 Webby Award, using an AI to write his acceptance speech at the ceremony at Cipriani in New York.

References

English male journalists
Hoaxers
English filmmakers
Living people
1992 births